Jeroen Hertzberger (born 24 February 1986) is a Dutch field hockey player who plays as a forward for Rotterdam and the Dutch national team.

Hertzberger was part of the Dutch national team for the 2007 Champions Trophy in Kuala Lumpur where the Dutch won the bronze medal. In 2008 they only finished in fourth place in Rotterdam. He also is part of the Dutch team that qualified for the 2008 Summer Olympics.

Hertzberger is the all-time top scorer in the Euro Hockey League competition with 26 goals. He scored the first hat-trick in 2018 Hockey World Cup against Malaysia.

References

External links

1986 births
Living people
Sportspeople from Rotterdam
Dutch male field hockey players
Male field hockey forwards
Olympic field hockey players of the Netherlands
Field hockey players at the 2008 Summer Olympics
2010 Men's Hockey World Cup players
2014 Men's Hockey World Cup players
Field hockey players at the 2016 Summer Olympics
2018 Men's Hockey World Cup players
Field hockey players at the 2020 Summer Olympics
Hockey India League players
HC Rotterdam players
Men's Hoofdklasse Hockey players
21st-century Dutch people